Ingrid Roxana Baldetti Elías (born May 13, 1962) was the first female Vice President of Guatemala from 2012 until her resignation amid a corruption scandal in 2015. She was convicted of fraud in 2018.

Early life
Baldetti was born in Guatemala City. She comes from a conservative, Catholic family. Her parents were Alejandro Baldetti and Gladys Elías de Baldetti. She attended primary school in the Colegio Monte Carmelo, graduating as a primary education teacher in El Sagrado Corazón de Jesús at the Historic Center of Guatemala. She obtained a bachelor's degree in Journalism at the University of San Carlos of Guatemala.

Career
Previously an elementary school substitute teacher, Baldetti started in journalism on the television news program Aquí el Mundo. She was co-founder of the news program TV Noticias. She worked at Univisión as a correspondent from Guatemala for the show Primer Impacto.

She worked in favor of women for the United Nations at a national level, including conferences within the Republic in partnership with Kellogg's Central America. She was founder of a beauty products company, also she founded a spa and hair salon chain.

Political career
In the 1990s, she was designated as the Subsecretary of Public Relations for the Presidency of the Republic. In 2001, she helped found the Patriot Party alongside Otto Pérez Molina. She was elected to Congress in 2004, she held the position of national-list congressional deputy for the Patriot Party. However, she presented her resignation to the Congress president before August 15, 2011, as she was going to participate as the vice presidential candidate for the same party, as Pérez Molina's running-mate. and she announced the elections day that she will retake her position as deputy. She has been the General Secretary of the Patriotic Party since 2009.

Personal life
In 1987 she married Mariano Paz, and they have two children, Luis Pedro and Mario.

Unexplained wealth
In 2013, Guatemalan newspaper El Periódico published details of Baldetti's purchases of multimillion-dollar homes and other luxury goods with unexplained wealth. Baldetti owns five properties and a helicopter worth over US$13 million, which could not be accounted for by her or her husband's income.

In response to the investigation into unexplained wealth, a Guatemalan judge initiated legal proceedings against the editor of El Periódico, José Rubén Zamora. The Inter American Press Association subsequently denounced the judicial action as a form of censorship.

Resignation, arrest, trials and sentence

Baldetti resigned from her post as Vice President on May 8, 2015, after a UN anti-corruption investigation arrested 24 individuals, including her personal secretary Juan Carlos Monzón Rojas, for involvement in an import bribery scheme known as La Línea (the Line) in which officials received bribes to reduce duties paid by importers.  Baldetti was detained on fraud charges on August 21, 2015, while at the hospital. Reportedly, wiretaps of those implicated in the scandals appears to refer to her involvement with references to "the R", "the No.2" and "the lady." Her arrest was followed by allegations by prosecutor Thelma Aldana against President Molina, and protests calling for his resignation.

On October 27, 2017, Judge Miguel Ángel Gálvez of Guatemala City ordered Baldetti, Pérez, and another 26 people, including former senior officials from Guatemala's customs duty system, to face trial on charges related to bribes channeled to officials helping businesses evade customs duties.

On October 9, 2018, Baldetti was sentenced to 15½ years in prison for fraud and other charges related to the issuance of government contracts to clean Lake Amatitlan. Additionally, she faces drug trafficking charges in the United States. 

On January 18, 2022, another "La Linea" related trial began for Baldetti, where she would this time serve as Pérez's co-defendant. She was sentenced on 7 December 2022 to 16 years in prisons for the graft case, but she can appeal.

References

External links
 in Spanish.
Roxana Baldetti at the Patriotic Party website in Spanish.

1962 births
Living people
Vice presidents of Guatemala
Patriotic Party (Guatemala) politicians
Members of the Congress of Guatemala
Guatemalan journalists
Guatemalan women journalists
People from Guatemala City
Universidad de San Carlos de Guatemala alumni
Women government ministers of Guatemala
Guatemalan people of Italian descent
21st-century Guatemalan women politicians
21st-century Guatemalan politicians
Guatemalan politicians convicted of crimes
Women vice presidents
Heads of government who were later imprisoned